The 2011 European Road Championships were held in Offida, Italy, between 14 and 17 July 2011. The event consisted of a road race and a time trial for men and women under 23 and juniors. The championships were regulated by the European Cycling Union.

Schedule

Time trial 
Thursday 14 July
 11:00 Women under-23, 25 km
 14:00 Men juniors, 25 km

Friday 15 July
 11:00 Women juniors, 15.1 km
 14:00 Men under-23, 25 km

Road race
Saturday 16 July
 09:00 Women under-23, 124.2 km
 14:00 Men juniors, 124.2 km

Sunday 17 July
 09:00 Women juniors, 69 km
 13:00 Men under-23, 179.4 km

Results

Medale table

References
 Schedule offida2011.it
 Results uec-federation.eu

External links
 Official website 

European Road Championships, 2011
2011 in Italian sport
European Road Championships by year
International cycle races hosted by Italy